Cold Blade or Yu nu qin qing is a 1970 Hong Kong action Mandarin Martial Arts directed by Chor Yuen. This is Chor Yuen's first film in Mandarin.

Film Restored 
The original film was lost. With a copy from Marie-Claire Quiquemelle, a film collector in France, the film was restored.

Cast
 Melinda Chen Man-Ling
 Kao Yuen
 Ingrid Hu Yin-Yin
 Cheung Ban
 Paul Chu Kong
 Tsung Yu
 Kong San
 Li Ying
 Lau Kong
 Lee Man-Tai
 Kuan-tai Chen
 Tung Choi-Bo
 Chow Siu-Loi
 Yeung Wai
 Wong Kin-Wah
 Cheng Mei-Mei
 Lau Wai-Man

Note: The list of names may have surname followed by first name.

References

External links
 
 Cold Blade at hkcinemamagic.com

1970 films
1970s action films
1970s Mandarin-language films
Films directed by Chor Yuen
Hong Kong action films
1970s Hong Kong films